Wayne A. Hartman (born December 14, 1967) is a Republican member of the Maryland House of Delegates. He serves in District 38C, representing Wicomico County and Worcester County including Ocean City, Maryland. He previously served on the Ocean City Council for one four-year term.

Early life
Hartman was born in Baltimore, Maryland on December 14, 1967. He attended Eastern Vocational Technical High School in Essex, Maryland, and graduated from the University of Phoenix in Phoenix, Arizona, earning a B.S. degree in business administration in 2006.

Hartman bought his first property in the Ocean City, Maryland at the age of 19 and, as of March 2016, owns 40 units in the resort town.

Hartman is married and has two children. He is the owner of Wayne Hartman Management LLC, a management services company in Ocean City, Maryland. Since 2019, he has served on the Atlantic General Hospital Foundation Board of Directors.

Ocean City Council
In 2014, Hartman was elected to serve on the Ocean City Council after receiving the endorsement of Citizens For Ocean City alongside three other candidates. As councilman, Hartman oversaw the construction of barrier systems on the boardwalk and the controversial refurbishment of memorial plaques on the boardwalk's benches. Hartman also served as the chairman for the Recreation and Parks Committee, as a member of the Police Commission, and on the Ocean City Noise Board. Prior to that, he sat on the ADA Committee as well as the Property Review and Enforcement Strategies for Safe Housing Committee.

In October 2017, Hartman proposed privatizing parts of the Ocean City boardwalk in order to control street performers and the town's homeless population. In May 2018, the Ocean City council voted 3-1 to consult legal counsel on the proposal to privatize the boardwalk's picnic tables. The council also voted unanimously to approve of several recommendations made by the Ocean City Police Department aimed at preventing loitering at the comfort station on Caroline Street, a popular location among the town's homeless population.

In December 2017, Hartman announced his candidacy for the Maryland House of Delegates after incumbent delegate Mary Beth Carozza said she would challenge state senator Jim Mathias in the 2018 Maryland Senate elections. He prevailed in the Republican primary with 49.3 percent of the vote, and did not face a Democratic challenger in the general elections.

In the legislature
Hartman was sworn into the Maryland House of Delegates on January 9, 2019. He has sponsored the following legislation that has successfully been enacted as Maryland law:
 HB 0233/2020 - Criminal Law – Assault in the First Degree – Strangulation
 HB 0349/2020 - Occupational and Professional Licensing - Service Members, Veterans, and Military Spouses - Revisions to Reciprocity Requirements
 HB 0362/2020 - Maryland National Guard - Tuition Assistance Program - Modifications
 HB 0521/2020 - Maryland Small Business Innovation Research Technical Assistance Program - Establishment
 HB 0545/2020 - State Board of Veterinary Medical Examiners – Cease and Desist Orders and Civil Penalties
 HB 0998/2020 - Maryland Loan Assistance Repayment Program for Physicians and Physician Assistants - Administration and Funding
 HB 0999/2020 - Rural Broadband for the Eastern Shore Act of 2020
 HB 1462/2020 - Public Health - Emergency Use Auto-Injectable Epinephrine Program - Revisions
 HB 1493/2020 - Worcester County - Special Event Zones - Prohibitions
 HB 0391/2021 - Solid Waste Management – Prohibition on Releasing a Balloon Into the Atmosphere

Hartman has filed to run for re-election in 2022.

Electoral history

References

Living people
21st-century American politicians
1967 births
Republican Party members of the Maryland House of Delegates
People from Ocean City, Maryland
Maryland city council members